Stare Kosiny  is a village in the administrative district of Gmina Wiśniewo, within Mława County, Masovian Voivodeship, in east-central Poland. 

References

Stare Kosiny